Emory Jenison Pike (December 18, 1876 – September 16, 1918) was a United States Army officer during World War I who received the Medal of Honor for his actions at Vandieres, France on September 15, 1918.  A 1901 graduate of West Point, and the only West Point graduate to be awarded the Medal of Honor during World War I, Pike was a lieutenant colonel at Vandieres.  His daughter was presented his Medal of Honor after the war. He was buried at Woodland Cemetery, Des Moines, Iowa.

Medal of Honor citation
Citation:
Having gone forward to reconnoiter new machinegun positions, Lt. Col. Pike offered his assistance in reorganizing advance infantry units which had become disorganized during a heavy artillery shelling. He succeeded in locating only about 20 men, but with these he advanced and when later joined by several infantry platoons rendered inestimable service in establishing outposts, encouraging all by his cheeriness, in spite of the extreme danger of the situation. When a shell had wounded one of the men in the outpost, Lt. Col. Pike immediately went to his aid and was severely wounded himself when another shell burst in the same place. While waiting to be brought to the rear, Lt. Col. Pike continued in command, still retaining his jovial manner of encouragement, directing the reorganization until the position could be held. The entire operation was carried on under terrific bombardment, and the example of courage and devotion to duty, as set by Lt. Col. Pike, established the highest standard of morale and confidence to all under his charge. The wounds he received were the cause of his death.

See also

List of Medal of Honor recipients

References

1876 births
1918 deaths
American military personnel killed in World War I
Burials at Woodland Cemetery (Des Moines, Iowa)
United States Army Medal of Honor recipients
United States Military Academy alumni
People from Iowa
World War I recipients of the Medal of Honor
United States Army personnel of World War I
United States Army officers